Francis de Bermingham (died 1677) was an Anglo-Irish lord of Athenry and Dunmore, County Galway.

References

 History of Galway, James Hardiman, Galway, 1820
 The Abbey of Athenry, Martin J. Blake, Journal of the Galway Archaeological and Historical Society, volume II, part ii, 1902
 The Birmingham family of Athenry, H.T. Knox, J.G.A.H.S., volume ten, numbers iii and iv, 1916–17.
 Remarks on the walls and church of Athenry, Charles Mac Neill, J.G.A.H.S., volume 11, numbers iii and iv, 1921
 Old Galway, Maureen Donovan O'Sullivan, 1942.
 Punann Arsa:The Story of Athenry, County Galway, Martin Finnerty, Ballinasloe, 1951.
 Athenry: A Medieval Irish Town, Etienne Rynne, Athenry Historical Society, Athenry, 1992

People from County Galway
1677 deaths
Barons Athenry
Francis